Pretty Little Liars is an Indonesian drama mystery streaming television series directed by Emil Heraldi for Viu. The series is adapted from the American television series of the same name by I. Marlene King, which is loosely based on a series of books by Sara Shepard. The series features an ensemble cast headed by Yuki Kato as Alissa, Anya Geraldine as Hanna, Eyka Farhana/Caitlin Halderman as Ema, Valerie Thomas as Sabrina, and Shindy Huang as Aria. The series also features Wulan Guritno, Tarra 
Budiman, Naufal Samudra, Jennifer Coppen, Cindy Nirmala, Giulio Parengkuan, Bio One, and Bastian Steel in starring roles. The first season was released on 22 April 2020 with 10 episodes. The second season premiered on 14 April 2022.

Premise
Set in the fictional town of Amerta, Bali, it follows the lives of four female college students whose clique falls apart when their leader, Alissa, goes mysteriously missing in the night of their high school graduation. One year later, Hanna, Ema, Sabrina and Aria find themselves reunited when they begin to receive messages from a mysterious figure known as "A", who threatens to expose their darkest secrets.

Cast and characters

Main

 Yuki Kato as Alissa, the manipulative and charming queen bee of the group who mysteriously disappeared the night of her high school graduation
 Anya Geraldine as Hanna, an it girl with eating disorder. As victims of Alissa's bullying, she along with Mona then transformed into the most popular girl in campus after Alissa's disappearance. 
 Eyka Farhana (season 1) and Caitlin Halderman (season 2) as Ema, a shy girl coming from a religious Malaysian family. She has been in a long-term relationship with Benny, before having an interest on Mahesa.
 Valerie Thomas as Sabrina, an academically-bright student who grew up in a competitive family, making her sister, Melissa, as her biggest rival. As the only person who isn't afraid of Alissa, she often challenges her.
 Shindy Huang as Aria, the one with the most secret to hide. After Alissa's disappearance, her father Bondan took his whole family to live in Jakarta for a year to forget the tragedy. Upon her return, Aria started an affair with her lecturer.
 Wulan Guritno as Amira, Hanna’s loving and recently-divorced mother who is willing to do anything for her daughter.
 Tarra Budiman as Eric, a new Indonesian language lecturer who’s having an affair with Aria
 Naufal Samudra as Mahesa, a new boy who moves into Alissa's old house. He formed a friendship, and later a relationship, with Ema much to her mother's dismay due to his religion. In season two, he is sent into rehabilitation and ended his relationship with Ema. He, however, later returned and reconciled their relationship.
 Jennifer Coppen as Mona, a nerd girl who used to be tormented by Alissa. She transformed herself once the latter disappeared, taking her place as the most popular girl on campus and continues Alissa's bullying towards Raka
 Cindy Nirmala as Jihan, Tama's step-sister who molested and forced him into having a relationship with her
 Giulio Parengkuan as Tama, an older kid Alissa used to bully. He has a tattoo to celebrate his freedom from Jihan, a favor Alissa did for him
 Bio One as Kevin (season 2), Hanna’s new boyfriend who is a hacker. He briefly moved in with Hanna and her mother 
 Bastian Steel as Malik (season 2), Ema's love interest. He is first introduced as being the man Asti cheated on with. Though liked by her mother, Ema is often uncomfortable with his lifestyle. In season two finale, Ema ended their relationship after finding out Asti is pregnant.

Recurring
 Marcell Darwin as Reno, a doctor and Melissa’s fiancé who has a feeling for Sabrina (season 1)
Evan Marvino as Benny, Ema's long-term boyfriend (season 1)
Chicco Kurniawan as Raka, a student who used to be bullied by Alissa
 Tegar Satrya as Darma, a corrupt detective who is investigating Alissa’s death (season 1)
 Naufal Azhar (season 1) and Farandika (season 2) as Sandy, Hanna’s boyfriend who refuses to be flirty with her
Sebastian Teti as Alex (season 1; guest season 2), Sabrina's love interest who works in a tennis club
Cheryl Marella as Illa, Bondan's wife and mothers to Aria and Miko
 Irgi Fahrezi as Bondan, Illa's unfaithful husband who had an affair with his student
 Anastasia Herzigova as Melissa, Sabrina's "perfect" sister and rival
 Imelda Laish (guest season 1) and Izabel Jahja (season 2) as Vero, Sabrina's and Melissa's attorney mother
 Richardo Benito as Peter, Vero's husband (season 1)
Nazia Mustafar (season 1) and Karina Suwandi (season 2) as Indah, Ema's religious mother who dislikes Mahesa, as she sees him as a bad influence to her daughter
 Damara Finch as Novan, a handsome and popular student that Aria used to have a crush on. The Liars grow suspicions on him after Hanna witnessed him writing a message behing Eric's car.
 Muhammad Ditra (season 1) and Fandy Christian (season 2) as Ian, Melissa’s husband who had a secret relationship with Alissa. Ian is killed in season two finale after someone pushed him off the cliff while attempting to kill Sabrina.
 Khiva Ishak as Captain Agung (season 2), a new detective replacing Darma
 Dito Darmawan as Gary (season 2), a police officer and acquaintances to The Liars who secretly is in a relationship with Jihan

Guest 

 Farish Nahdi as Jason, Alissa's older brother
 Pascal Azhar as Tommy (season 1), Hanna’s father who left his family for another woman
 Johan Morgan as Willy (season 2)
 Clafita Witoko as Sandra (season 2), Aria's former babysitter
 Intan Annur as Asti (season 2), a girl who cheated on her boyfriend with Malik. In season two finale, it's revealed she has been impregnated by Malik.
 Revaldo as James (season 2)
 Keanu Campora sebagai Edgar (season 2)
 Stevie Domminique as Julia (season 2), Eric's former fiancée

Episodes

Series overview

Season 1 (2020)

Season 2 (2022)

Production

Development 
The series was announced on August 27, 2019 along with the ensemble cast. The series is produced by Asian streaming service, Viu, in collaboration with Warner Bros International Television Production.

Although the series had never been renewed officially, it has been confirmed by Viu on Instagram in August 2020 that the second season is on development. Anya Geraldine later that year stated the production for the second season will most likely begin in June 2021.

Casting 
Along with the series' announcement, it wasannounced that Anya Geraldine, Eyka Farhana, Valerie Thomas, and Shindy Huang are set to play the main characters Hanna, Ema, Sabrina, and Aria. Yuki Kato also joined in her role as Alissa, the famous it girl and queen bee of the group. 

Eyka Farhana who was initially scheduled to return for season two decided to leave due the COVID-19. Caitlin Halderman joined to replace Eyka in the role of Ema. In addition, Bio One and Bastian Steel joined the main cast in their respective roles as Kevin and Malik for season two; Khiva Ishak joined in a guest role as a detective. Another addition in the cast are Fandy Christian, Farandika, Izabel Jahja, and Karina Suwandi replacing the previous cast members as Ian, Sandy, Vero, and Indah.

Filming 
The first season was filmed in Bali, Indonesia in 40 days from June to August 2019.

Writing 
Due to Indonesian cultures, Ema's (Emily) sexuality has been erased and replaced with her falling for a boy from a different religion. As a result, her love interest Mahesa (Maya) and Malik's (Paige) characters were completely rewritten.

Music 
Yovial Virgi produced the series' score and its theme song, "Secret" by cast member Jennifer Coppen. The song is used for both the opening sequence and end credit, with the former using a remix version.

Release 
The first season consisted of 10 episodes and were released on April 22, 2020. The second season premiered on April 14, 2022 and concluded on May 18, 2022.

References

External links 
 

2020s college television series
2020s Indonesian television series
2020 Indonesian television series debuts
Television shows based on American novels
Indonesian-language television shows
Pretty Little Liars (franchise)
Indonesian television series based on American television series
Viu (streaming media) original programming
Television series impacted by the COVID-19 pandemic